A torpedo dessert is a buttery, flaky viennoiserie bread roll, filled with pastry cream, named for its well-known torpedo shape. Croissants and other viennoiserie are made of a layered yeast-leavened dough. The dough is layered with butter, rolled and folded several times in succession, then rolled into a sheet, in a technique called laminating. The process results in a layered, flaky texture, similar to a puff pastry.

See also
 Cannoli
 Cream horn
 List of pastries

References

Bulgarian cuisine
Polish desserts
Russian desserts
Turkish desserts
Turkish pastries
Foods featuring butter